Óscar López Balestra (14 October 1934 – 27 February 2023) was a Uruguayan politician. A member of the National Party, he served in the Chamber of Representatives from 1972 to 1973 and again from 1985 to 1990.

López died on 27 February 2023, at the age of 88.

References

1934 births
2023 deaths
National Party (Uruguay) politicians
Members of the Chamber of Representatives of Uruguay
People from Tacuarembó
20th-century Uruguayan politicians